Maqsudabad (also Romanized as Maqşūdābād) is a village in Safiabad Rural District, Bam and Safiabad District, Esfarayen County, North Khorasan Province, Iran. At the 2006 census, its population was 416, in 105 families.

References 

Populated places in Esfarayen County